Hypotrachyna laevigata is a species of foliose lichen belonging to the family Parmeliaceae.

It has a cosmopolitan distribution.

References

laevigata
Lichen species
Lichens described in 1808
Taxa named by James Edward Smith